Domeciidae is a family of crabs.

Subfamilies and genera
The World Register of Marine Species lists the following genera:
Domecia Eydoux & Souleyet, 1842
Jonesius Sankarankutty, 1962
Maldivia Borradaile, 1902
Palmyria Galil & Takeda, 1986

References

External links

Crabs
Decapod families